Plant taxonomy is the science that finds, identifies, describes, classifies, and names plants. It is one of the main branches of taxonomy (the science that finds, describes, classifies, and names living things).

Plant taxonomy is closely allied to plant systematics, and there is no sharp boundary between the two. In practice, "plant systematics" involves relationships between plants and their evolution, especially at the higher levels, whereas "plant taxonomy" deals with the actual handling of plant specimens. The precise relationship between taxonomy and systematics, however, has changed along with the goals and methods employed.

Plant taxonomy is well known for being turbulent, and traditionally not having any close agreement on circumscription and placement of taxa. See the list of systems of plant taxonomy.

Background

Classification systems serve the purpose of grouping organisms by characteristics common to each group. Plants are distinguished from animals by various traits: they have cell walls made of cellulose, polyploidy, and they exhibit sedentary growth. Where animals have to eat organic molecules, plants are able to change energy from light into organic energy by the process of photosynthesis. The basic unit of classification is species, a group able to breed amongst themselves and bearing mutual resemblance, a broader classification is the genus. Several genera make up a family, and several families an order.

Plantae, the Plant Kingdom

The plant kingdom is divided according to the following:

Identification, classification  and description of plants

Three goals of plant taxonomy are the identification, classification and description of plants.  The distinction between these three goals is important and often overlooked.

Plant identification is a determination of the identity of an unknown plant by comparison with previously collected specimens or with the aid of books or identification manuals.  The process of identification connects the specimen with a published name.  Once a plant specimen has been identified, its name and properties are known.

Plant classification is the placing of known plants into groups or categories to show some relationship.  Scientific classification follows a system of rules that standardizes the results, and groups successive categories into a hierarchy.  For example, the family to which the lilies belong is classified as follows:

 Kingdom: Plantae
 Division: Magnoliophyta
 Class: Liliopsida
 Order: Liliales
 Family: Liliaceae

The classification of plants results in an organized system for the naming and cataloging of future specimens, and ideally reflects scientific ideas about inter-relationships between plants. The set of rules and recommendations for formal botanical nomenclature, including plants, is governed by the International Code of Nomenclature for algae, fungi, and plants abbreviated as ICN.

Plant description  is a formal description of a newly discovered species, usually in the form of a scientific paper using ICN guidelines. The names of these plants are then registered on the International Plant Names Index along with all other validly published names.

Classification systems

These include;

APG system (angiosperm phylogeny group)
APG II system (angiosperm phylogeny group II)
APG III system (angiosperm phylogeny group III)
APG IV system (angiosperm phylogeny group IV)
Bessey system (a system of plant taxonomy)
Cronquist system (taxonomic classification of flowering plants)
Melchior system

Online databases

 Ecocrop
 EPPO Code
 GRIN

See Category: Online botany databases

See also
 American Society of Plant Taxonomists
 Biophysical environment
 Botanical nomenclature
 Citrus taxonomy
 Environmental protection
 Herbarium
 History of plant systematics
 International Association for Plant Taxonomy
 Taxonomy of cultivated plants

References

External links 
 Plant systematics
 Tracking Plant Taxonomy Updates discussion group